Henry H. Bodenstab (June 29, 1874December 28, 1948) was an American lawyer and Republican politician.  He served four years in the Wisconsin State Senate, representing the north side of the city of Milwaukee and northern Milwaukee County.

Biography
Bodenstab was born on June 29, 1874, in Howards Grove, Wisconsin. His father, Julius Bodenstab, had just finished his second of two terms as a Liberal Republican member of the Assembly.

He graduated from the University of Michigan Law School in 1898.

He died in Milwaukee on December 28, 1948.

Career
Bodenstab was a member of the Senate from 1909 to 1912. He was a Republican.

He was a candidate for the U.S. House of Representatives in 1919, but was defeated by Victor L. Berger.

References

External links
 
The Political Graveyard

People from Howards Grove, Wisconsin
Republican Party Wisconsin state senators
Wisconsin lawyers
University of Michigan Law School alumni
1874 births
1948 deaths
Politicians from Milwaukee
Lawyers from Milwaukee